The men's 50 kilometres walk event at the 2014 Asian Games was held on the streets of Incheon, South Korea on 1 October.

Schedule
All times are Korea Standard Time (UTC+09:00)

Records

Results
Legend
DSQ — Disqualified

References

Final results

Walk 50 kilometres men
2014 50km men